Nagrota Bagwan is a town and a municipal council in Kangra district in the Indian state of Himachal Pradesh. It is important town situated in Kangra valley around serene lap of Dhauladhar Mountain Range. It is a major market area with numerous stores and showrooms. Area also has an industrial area with small scale industries. There are various automobile showrooms around the town. It is located within center of 3 main towns of the valley: Dharamshala, Palampur and Kangra.

Despite the town area Nagrota Bagwan tehsil is most densely populated tehsil in Himachal with 809 person per km² due to its plain fertile topography despite its closeness to high elevation snow clad mountain range.

Demographics
 India census, Nagrota Bagwan had a population of 5900 of which 3,001 are males while 2,899 are females as per report released by Census India 2011. It ranks 27th in all the state. Males constitute 50.86% of the population and females 49.14%. Nagrota Bagwan has an average literacy rate of 91.76%, higher than the national average of 74%, male literacy is 93.59%, and female literacy is 87.87%.

Despite the town area Nagrota Bagwan tehsil is most densely populated tehsil in Himachal with 809 person per km² due to its plain fertile topography despite its closeness to high elevation snow clad mountain range.

Transportation 
 
   
It is well connected with most modes of transportation

Nagrota Railway station is one of the major station in the Kangra Valley Railways with 4 tracks which is more than Palampur and Kangra stations.

ISBT Nagrota is new built up with all basic needs such as cafe and petrol pump within its premises and old bus stand and taxi stand are in the town too

Kangra Airport is just 18 km from the main town.

Education 
Nagrota Bagwan has become a center of education throughout the state. Numerous institutions are located in this town and constituency. It is the only constituency in Himachal Pradesh to have both government Medical and Engineering colleges. It includes prestigious Dr. Rajendra Prasad Medical College Tanda, Rajiv Gandhi government engineering college, Govt. Pharmacy college, Post Graduate college, etc. There are numerous good schools, too. In CBSE, it includes Rainbow International (British Council Awarded) and Green Field & in-state board Himalayan Public and Ishan Public school. Numerous private training centres are also in the region.

References

Cities and towns in Kangra district